Marion Cumbo (March 1, 1899 – September 17, 1990) was a cellist who was a member of the Negro String Quartet and the American String Quartet.

He was married to Clarissa Cumbo.

References 

1899 births
1990 deaths
20th-century African-American musicians
American cellists
20th-century cellists